The 2012 Monza GP2 Series round was a GP2 Series motor race held on September 8 and 9, 2012 at Autodromo Nazionale Monza, Italy. It was the penultimate round of the 2012 GP2 Series. The race supported the 2012 Italian Grand Prix.

GP2 championship contenders Luiz Razia and Davide Valsecchi both arrived at Monza with equal points. By the end of the meeting, Razia had failed to score in both races while Valsecchi finished sixth in the Feature race and won the Sprint race, which — combined with an extra two points for a fastest lap — gave him a twenty-five point lead going into the final round in Singapore.

Classification

Qualifying

Feature race

Sprint race

Notes:
 — Felipe Nasr and Luiz Razia each received five-place grid penalties for causing avoidable accidents during the Feature race.

Standings after the round

Drivers' Championship standings

Teams' Championship standings

 Note: Only the top five positions are included for both sets of standings.

See also 
 2012 Italian Grand Prix
 2012 Monza GP3 Series round

References

Monza
Monza GP2